Cameron Bright (born Cameron Douglas Crigger; January 26, 1993) is a Canadian actor. He has appeared in the films The Butterfly Effect, Godsend, Birth, Running Scared, Ultraviolet, X-Men: The Last Stand, Thank You for Smoking and three installments of The Twilight Saga.

Life and career
Bright was born in Victoria, British Columbia the son of Anne Bright and Jake Crigger. He was given his middle name "Douglas" after his maternal grandfather. His first acting job was in a commercial for Telus, which was soon followed by a guest appearance on the television series, Higher Ground. He subsequently appeared in several minor roles in made-for-television films, and was credited as "Cameron Crigger" for his roles (from the 2000 television movie, The Christmas Secret, to an episode of Night Visions).

After a supporting part in The Butterfly Effect, Bright's first major role was in Godsend, a horror film co-starring Robert De Niro; the film was released in April 2004 to mixed reviews. In his next film, Birth, he played a ten-year-old boy who claims to be the reincarnation of a woman's (Nicole Kidman) deceased husband. Two scenes within the movie sparked controversy and drew media attention to Bright. In one scene, Bright and Kidman's characters kiss; in the other, the two share a bathtub. The actors wore pale beige-coloured swimsuits in the bath scenes and were never naked or filmed together in the same room at the same time of the bathtub scene, although this was not public knowledge at first.

Bright was cast in several Hollywood films released in 2006, including Thank You for Smoking, Ultraviolet, and the action-thriller named Running Scared.

He starred in X-Men: The Last Stand, where he played the mutant Leech, who has the mutant antibody. He also appeared on an episode of The 4400 (episode: "The Wrath Of Graham") as a high school student named Graham Holt who develops an ability after injecting himself with Promicin. He has also played a host carrier for a cure for humanity in more than one movie.

Bright plays the Volturi vampire Alec, twin brother to Jane who is played by Dakota Fanning, in the  Twilight films New Moon (2009), Eclipse (2010), and Breaking Dawn, Part II (2012).

Filmography

Film

Television

References

External links

1993 births
Canadian male child actors
Canadian male film actors
Canadian male television actors
Living people
Male actors from Victoria, British Columbia
20th-century Canadian male actors
21st-century Canadian male actors